Robert Sara (born 9 June 1946) is an Austrian former professional footballer  who played as a defender. His younger brother Josef was also a footballer.

Club career
Sara was bornborn in Oberlainsitz, near St. Martin im Waldviertel. He became a club legend at Austria Wien, after staying 20 years at the club and winning major silverware with them. He started his professional career at 19 and won nine league titles, 6 domestic cups and played in the 1978 Cup Winner's Cup Final which they lost 4–0 against Anderlecht. His 571 games is a record for the most appearances by a player in the Austrian top flight.

Sara was chosen in Austria's Team of the Century in 2001.

International career
Sara made his debut for the Austria national team in a 3–2 win over England at Wembley in October 1965 and played in the 1978 FIFA World Cup finals. Captain of the team, he played the decisive pass to Hans Krankl to score the winning goal against arch-rivals West Germany in a game dubbed The miracle of Córdoba, which the Austrians won 3–2 and which was Austria's first win against West Germany for 47 years.

He earned 55 caps, scoring three goals. His last international was a May 1980 friendly match against Argentina.

Honours
Austria Wien
Austrian Bundesliga (8): 1968–69, 1969–70, 1975–76, 1977–78, 1978–79, 1979–80, 1980–81, 1983–84, 1984–85
Austrian Cup (6): 1966-67, 1970–71, 1973–74, 1976–77, 1979–80, 1981–82

External links
 Player profile – Austria Wien archive

References

1946 births
Living people
People from Gmünd District
Footballers from Lower Austria
Austrian footballers
Austria international footballers
Association football defenders
1978 FIFA World Cup players
FK Austria Wien players
Austrian Football Bundesliga players
Austrian football managers
FK Austria Wien managers
Favoritner AC players